Krache (Krachi, Krakye) is a Guang language spoken by 58,000 in Ghana.

References

External links
ComparaLex, database with Krache word list

Guang languages
Languages of Ghana